Hugo Mariutti (born 18 December 1975) is a Brazilian musician, best known as the guitarist of Henceforth, Viper and Andre Matos' solo band and also as the guitarist of Shaman, in which he plays with his brother Luis Mariutti, who is also the former bassist of Angra.

Discography

Shaman 
(2002) – Ritual
(2003) – RituAlive
(2005) – Reason

Andre Matos 
(2007) – Time to Be Free
(2009) – Mentalize
(2012) – The Turn of the Lights

Henceforth 
(2005) – Henceforth
(2011) – The Gray Album

Remove Silence 
(2009) – Fade
(2012) – Stupid Human Atrocity
(2013) – Little Piece of Heaven

Solo career 
(2014) – A Blank Sheet of Paper
(2017) – For a Simple Rainy Day
(2019) – Gone (single)
(2020) – Poems (single)
(2021) – Why? (single)

Other projects 
(2007) – Tempestt – Bring 'Em On

References 

Brazilian people of Italian descent
Brazilian heavy metal guitarists
Brazilian male guitarists
Living people
1975 births
Musicians from São Paulo
Shaman (band) members
21st-century guitarists
21st-century male musicians